Mertzig is a commune and town in central Luxembourg. It is part of Diekirch Canton.

, the town of Mertzig itself, which lies in the centre of the commune, has a population of 1,439.

Mertzig was formed on 30 December 1874, when it was detached from the commune of Feulen. The law forming Mertzig was passed on 20 November 1874.

Footballer Wimm Fledermaus once managed a hotel in Mertzig.

Population

References

External links
 

Communes in Diekirch (canton)
Towns in Luxembourg